Inherit the Wind  is a 1999 American made-for-television film adaptation of the 1955 play of the same name which originally aired on Showtime. The original play was written as a parable which fictionalized the 1925 Scopes "Monkey" Trial as a means of discussing the 1950s McCarthy trials.

George C. Scott, appearing in his last performance, played Brady. In the 1996 Broadway revival he played Drummond.

Plot summary

Cast
 Jack Lemmon as Henry Drummond
 George C. Scott as Matthew Harrison Brady
 Beau Bridges as E. K. Hornbeck
 John Cullum as Judge Coffey
 Brad Greenquist as Tom Davenport 
 Lane Smith as Rev. Brown
 Tom Everett Scott	as Bertram T. Cates
 Kathryn Morris as Rachel Brown
 Piper Laurie as Sarah Brady

Awards
Golden Globes
 Won:Best Performance by an Actor in a Mini-Series or Motion Picture Made for TV - Jack Lemmon

American Cinema Foundation, USA
 Nominated: E Pluribus Unum Award, Television Movie

Directors Guild of America, USA
 Nominated: DGA Award, Outstanding Directorial Achievement in Movies for Television, Daniel Petrie

Emmy Awards
 Nominated: Outstanding Lead Actor in a Miniseries or a Movie - Jack Lemmon
 Nominated: Outstanding Supporting Actor in a Miniseries or a Movie - Beau Bridges

Screen Actors Guild Awards
 Nominated: Outstanding Performance by a Male Actor in a Television Movie or Miniseries -George C. Scott

IGCSE Literature
Drama
 Inherit the Wind is used as one of the works studied under Drama for the IGCSE.

See also 

 List of American films of 1999
 Trial movies

Notes

External links and references
 
 
 
 Geoffrey Gould reports from the set of Inherit the Wind
 Variety review
 Pals revisit Scopes in Inherit the Wind

1999 television films
1999 films
1999 drama films
Films about religion
Films about lawyers
Drama films based on actual events
1990s legal films
American courtroom films
American films based on plays
United Artists films
Scopes Trial
Cultural depictions of Clarence Darrow
Cultural depictions of John T. Scopes
Films à clef
Films directed by Daniel Petrie
American legal drama films
Showtime (TV network) films
Films scored by Laurence Rosenthal
American drama television films
1990s English-language films
1990s American films